Sumu-Abum (also Su-abu) was an Amorite, and the first King of the First Dynasty of Babylon (the Amorite Dynasty). He reigned between 1830–1817 BC (short chronology) or between 1897–1883 BC (middle chronology). He freed a small area of land previously ruled by the fellow Amorite city state of Kazallu which included Babylon, then a minor administrative center in southern Mesopotamia. Sumu-Abum (and the three Amorite kings succeeding him) makes no claim to be King of Babylon, suggesting that the town was at this time still of little importance. He is known to have become king of Kisurra.

References

19th-century BC Babylonian kings
19th-century BC rulers
First dynasty of Babylon